Pedro David Rosendo Marques (born 25 April 1998) is a Portuguese professional footballer who plays as a striker for Dutch club NEC Nijmegen.

Club career

Sporting CP
Born in Carcavelos, Cascais, Marques spent much of his childhood at local G.D. Estoril Praia and C.F. Os Belenenses before joining Sporting CP in 2016. On 14 August that year, he made his professional debut with the latter's reserves against S.C. Covilhã, coming on as a 65th-minute substitute for Ricardo Almeida in the 2–1 LigaPro away win. He scored his first goal six days later, in a 2–4 home loss to AD Fafe. He netted twice more over the season, both in a 2–2 draw with Gil Vicente F.C. on 17 September.

Marques made his first-team debut on 13 December 2018 in the last game of the UEFA Europa League group stage at home against Ukraine's FC Vorskla Poltava, playing the last half-hour in place of Fredy Montero. The following 29 March, he was called up for the Primeira Liga match away to G.D. Chaves the next day.

Marques was loaned out on 15 July 2019 to FC Dordrecht of the Dutch Eerste Divisie. The following 22 January, he went to FC Den Bosch in the same league on the same basis. With 14 goals over the course of the campaign before its annulment due to the COVID-19 pandemic, he was fifth among its goalscorers; this included a hat-trick on 21 February 2020, albeit in a 6–4 defeat at SBV Excelsior.

On 23 November 2020, Marques scored his first goals for the main Sporting team in the form of a brace in a 7–1 away victory over SG Sacavenense in the third round of the Taça de Portugal; he only needed 18 minutes to achieve this feat. In February 2021, he joined Gil Vicente on loan until 30 June.

Marques had his first top-flight experience at Gil, scoring five goals over what remained of the season; his first was to open a 4–2 win at Vitória S.C. on 14 March 2021. On 4 August that year he was lent to another team of the same league, F.C. Famalicão.

NEC
On 21 June 2022, Marques returned to Dutch football, signing for three years with an option for a fourth one with Eredivisie club NEC Nijmegen.

References

External links

Portuguese League profile 

1998 births
Living people
Sportspeople from Cascais
Portuguese footballers
Association football forwards
Primeira Liga players
Liga Portugal 2 players
Campeonato de Portugal (league) players
Sporting CP B players
Sporting CP footballers
Gil Vicente F.C. players
F.C. Famalicão players
Eredivisie players
Eerste Divisie players
FC Dordrecht players
FC Den Bosch players
NEC Nijmegen players
Portugal youth international footballers
Portuguese expatriate footballers
Expatriate footballers in the Netherlands
Portuguese expatriate sportspeople in the Netherlands